Watson's Wine is a wine retailer in Hong Kong and a member of the A.S. Watson Group (ASW), a wholly owned subsidiary of CK Hutchison Holdings Limited (CK Hutchison). They offer a comprehensive selection of fine wine, spirits, accessories and cigars. With vintages sourced directly from over 20 countries, Watson's Wine lists over 2,000 different wines, more than 400 of which are "exclusive" and cannot be found elsewhere.

A distinctive feature of each retail store is the Fine Wine Room containing over 300 different vintages ranging from the top Chateaux from Bordeaux to emerging New World Classics from around the world.

All wines are temperature controlled, 24 hours per day, both in the stores and the state-of-the-art wine warehouse, ensuring the provenance of all wines are perfectly maintained when they reach the customer.

It opened its first store in International Finance Centre, Central, Hong Kong in 1998. It is now the largest specialist wine store in Hong Kong, which has 20 retail stores in Hong Kong, 2 retail stores in Macau and an online shopping site .

All staff in the stores are trained on their wine knowledge and required to pass the "Wine & Spirit Education Trust" courses.

The Watson's Wine Club which offers members a number of benefits including rewards with purchase, a regular wine magazine, invitations to wine tastings and events as well as exclusive benefits with a number of loyalty partners.

In 2007, Watson's Wine was named "Best Retailer" in Hong Kong's wine industry by Wine Business International, a global wine business publication in recognition of its outstanding performance.

In August 2007 Watson's Wine opened a store-within-store concept at the Venetian, Macau in partnership with travel retailer Nuance-Watson. The wine section offers guests at the biggest casino resort complex in Asia an excellent selection of fine wine and professional service.

Link
Watson's Wine

References

Retail companies established in 1998
AS Watson
Wine retailers
Drink companies of Hong Kong